Ursule Wibaut (born 1887, date of death unknown) was a French footballer. He competed in the men's tournament at the 1908 Summer Olympics.

References

External links
 

1887 births
Year of death missing
French footballers
France international footballers
Olympic footballers of France
Footballers at the 1908 Summer Olympics
Place of birth missing
Association football defenders